Putra Heights is a residential township in Subang Jaya, Selangor, Malaysia. It is located within the mukim of Petaling District. The township is visible by the tall Bukit Cermin in Putra Heights.

Transportation

Highways and expressways 
The township is accessible via many major expressways, roads and railway network. The expressway that passes directly through the township is North–South Expressway Central Link (ELITE). The interchange at ELITE was opened to traffic on 19 February 2009, as the main route to Putra Heights. Other major expressways which connects through the ELITE expressway are the New Klang Valley Expressway (NKVE), Damansara–Puchong Expressway (LDP), South Klang Valley Expressway (SKVE) and Shah Alam Expressway (KESAS).

Metro system (LRT) 
The township is now connected via LRT as of 2016. The  Putra Heights LRT station on Rapid KL's  Kelana Jaya Line and  Sri Petaling Line is located at Persiaran Putra Indah near Putra Point Commercial Centre and the Giant hypermarket. The LRT Extension Project (LEP) extended the Sri Petaling Line and Kelana Jaya Line to Putra Heights station. It is now the current southern terminus for both the LRT lines, where the station offers a cross-platform interchange between the two lines. The Kelana Jaya Line has been extended from its former terminus at  Kelana Jaya station and the Subang Depot, running through residential areas and townships such as Ara Damansara, Kelana Jaya, Subang Jaya(where it integrates with the KTM Komuter  Port Klang Line at  Subang Jaya station), USJ (where it integrates with the  BRT Sunway Line at  USJ 7 station), Alam Megah , Subang Alam and finally to Putra Heights. The LRT line also connects commercial and recreational centres nearby the station such as the Dana 1 commercial centre, Kelana Centre Point, Subang Parade, the Empire Shopping Gallery, The Summit Shopping Mall, Main Place USJ, SS15 Courtyard, The 19 USJ City Mall and Da Men Mall USJ. Similarly, the Sri Petaling Line has been extended from its former terminus at  Sri Petaling station, running through Awan Besar, Kampung Muhibbah, Bandar Kinrara where it runs along the Bukit Jalil Highway and through the Puchong city centre along the Damansara-Puchong Expressway (LDP) before going through Puchong Prima, Puchong Perdana and terminating at Putra Heights. The Sri Petaling Line also connects various recreational and commercial centres such as Giant Hypermarket Kinrara, IOI Mall Puchong, Tesco Hypermarket Puchong, SetiaWalk Puchong, Bandar Puteri Puchong and Kompleks Puchong Perdana. The station is the 2nd station after  Masjid Jamek station that integrates both the Kelana Jaya Line and Sri Petaling Line.

External links 
 Komuniti Putra Heights
 Sime Darby Property - Developer of Putra Heights
 MBSJ Official Website
 LRT Extension in Klang Valley

Subang Jaya
Townships in Selangor